Finland competed at the 2014 European Athletics Championships winning 2 medals.

Medals

Men's events

Track and road

Field

Women's events

Track

Field

References

Nations at the 2014 European Athletics Championships
2014
European Athletics Championships